A bone is a rigid connective organ that makes up the skeleton of vertebrates.

Bone may also refer to:

Places 
 Bône (département), a short-lived French department in Algeria
 Bone, Idaho, unincorporated community
 Annaba, a city in Algeria, formerly known as Bône
 Bone Regency, a regency of Indonesia
 Bone state, an Indonesian state existing between 1350 and 1960

People 
 Bone (surname)
 "Bone," nickname of Major League Baseball player Jay Buhner
 Boné Uaferro (born 1992), Mozambican football defender

Arts, entertainment, and media

Fictional characters
 Bone, a cat from the Warriors novel series
 Mr. Bone, pseudonym of Dr. David Huxley in Bringing Up Baby (1938)

Games
 Bone: Out from Boneville, a computer game based on the Bone comic book series
 Bone: The Great Cow Race, the sequel to Bone: Out from Boneville
 Bone, a slang term for objects used in gaming:
 Dice
 Bone (dominoes), in dominoes

Literature
 Bones, a novel by Zimbwabean author Chenjerai Hove
 Bone, a novel by Fae Myenne Ng
 Bone (comics), a comic book series by Jeff Smith

Music 
 Bone (recording), Soviet-era bootleg records, scratched into scavenged sheets ofplastic
 Bone, a band composed of Hugh Hopper, Nick Didkovsky and John Roulat
 Bone Thugs-n-Harmony, an American rap group from Cleveland, Ohio or the members of the group
 Trombone, musical instrument, casually referred to as "bone" in slang
 Bone, a 2004 album by Tim Booth
 "Bones", a song by Die Monster Die from Withdrawal Method
 "Bones", a song by Joe Walsh from There Goes the Neighborhood

Radio
 WILT (FM), a radio station licensed to Wrightsville Beach, North Carolina, United States once known as 103.7 the Bone 
 WNTB, a radio station licensed to Topsail Beach, North Carolina, United States once known as 93.7 the Bone

Other uses in arts, entertainment, and media
 Bone (film), a 1972 film directed by Larry Cohen
 BONE, a journal published by the International Bone and Mineral Society

Other uses 
 Bone (corsetry), a rigid vertical rib that gives a corset its shape and rigidity
 The Bone, a feature of Maolán Buí, Ireland
 Bone, a type of dog toy, some of which are artificial
 Bone, an element used in skeletal animation
 Bone, a slang term for the United States dollar
 B-1 Lancer bomber, known as bone (from "B-one")
 Bone china, a type of porcelain

See also 
Boner (disambiguation)
Bones (disambiguation)